Heanor Gate Spencer Academy is a medium-sized secondary academy school and specialist Science College located in Heanor in the Amber Valley district of Derbyshire, England. Although in 2012 the school achieved an "outstanding" Ofsted report, in 2013 the school was downgraded to "inadequate", which resulted in the school being placed in special measures.

History
It opened in September 1964 as Heanor Gate County Secondary School, a secondary modern school being officially opened on 19 June 1965. In the 1990s, it became a grant maintained school. It became a foundation school, very similar to grant maintained status, and added a sixth form. In 2002, it gained Science College specialist status, the first in Derbyshire. This was incorporated into the school's name from October 2002. The school converted to an Academy in November 2011. The school then became part of the Spencer Academies Trust from September 2014 and was officially renamed from Heanor Gate Science College to Heanor Gate Spencer Academy on 1 September 2021.

Former schools
Other schools that combined to produce the school include Heanor Grammar School on Mundy Street, the William Howitt Secondary Modern School on Loscoe Road and Loscoe Road Girls Secondary Modern School. The former grammar school became the South East Derbyshire College in 1976.

School buildings
In February 2010 the Art and Technology block (H block) suffered a devastating fire caused by an electrical fault, which resulted in the Art section of the building being completely destroyed. This section of the block was consequently removed and replaced with a covered work area for the construction students. The Art block was subsequently moved to the newly built N block. This block then received an extension in 2012.

In 2013 the Science block (F block) was completely refurbished to provide new and improved science facilities for the school.

The Sixth Form block (S block) was also refurbished in 2014 to provide a larger space for the students and some new class rooms.

A new Student Support block (T block) was also constructed in 2014 to provide better facilities for students requiring educational support or help during school life from the school.

Admissions
The school accepts children aged 11–16. The Post 16 Centre (Sixth Form) is for ages 16–18.

School buildings
The school has a total of 15 blocks, some part of the original school, although some are temporary buildings.

 A block- Admin and Reception
 B block- Hall and Gym, PEPA (Physical Education, Dance, Drama) 
 C block- Careers & Support Centre
 D block- Mathematics & English
 E block- English, Business Studies and Computer Studies
 F block- Sciences (Physics, Chemistry, Biology)
 G block- Sciences, including Social Sciences (Psychology & Sociology) 
 H block- Design Tech and Catering (part of the original art building was destroyed in the fire)
 J block- Humanities, Achievement Centre
 K block- Modern Foreign Languages
 L block- Hair and Beauty, Beauty Salon
 M block- Music
 N block- Art & Design, Sociology
 S block- Sixth Form Centre
 T block- Student and SEN Support

Academic performance
It gets GCSE results at about the average for comprehensive schools in England, but slightly below average for Derbyshire. A-Level results are slightly under the England average.

References

External links 
Heanor Gate Science College website
 Heanor Gate Science College History
 Religious Education
 Inspection Report. Ofsted (27 March 2008).
 EduBase

News items
 Ballet dancer injured in 2003
 Art block (H block) burnt down in 2010

Academies in Derbyshire
Educational institutions established in 1964
1964 establishments in England
Secondary schools in Derbyshire